Stallion Canyon is a 1949 American Western film directed by Harry L. Fraser and written by Hy Heath. The film stars Ken Curtis, Carolina Cotton, Shug Fisher, Forrest Taylor, Ted Adams and Billy Hammond. The film was released on June 15, 1949, by Astor Pictures.

Plot

Cast          
Ken Curtis as Curt Benson
Carolina Cotton as Ellen Collins
Shug Fisher as Red
Forrest Taylor as Tom Lawson
Ted Adams as Wolf Norton
Billy Hammond as Little Bear
Roy Butler as Sheriff Breezy
Alice Richey as Milly Collins
L.H. Larsen as Steve 
Dick Hammer as Luke 
Clark Veater as Dobie
D.C. Swapp as Judge Thompson
Gail Bailey as Laramie
Bud Gates as Idaho
Bob Brandon as Johnny Adams

References

External links
 

1949 films
1940s English-language films
American Western (genre) films
1949 Western (genre) films
Astor Pictures films
Films directed by Harry L. Fraser
1940s American films